Robin Georges Sauveur Desserne (born 1 March 1984) is a retired French football who played as a defender.

External links
 Profile at footballdatabase.eu
 Profile at Soccerway

1984 births
Living people
Association football defenders
French footballers
UE Lleida players
CE Sabadell FC footballers
Málaga CF players
Chamois Niortais F.C. players